The 2001 Montreal Alouettes finished in third place in the East Division following a disastrous end to the season. After starting the season with a 9–2 record, Anthony Calvillo was injured in a game against the Hamilton Tiger-Cats, and he missed several games, leading to the team losing its remaining seven games, as well as their playoff game, to finish the season with a 9–9 record. Head Coach Rod Rust was fired after 17 games and General Manager Jim Popp replaced him as interim Head Coach for the last regular season game and only playoff game, losing both.

Offseason

CFL draft

Preseason

Regular season

Season standings

Season Schedule

Roster

Playoffs

East Semi-Final

Awards

2001 CFL All-Star Selections
Bryan Chiu – Centre
Terry Baker – Punter

2001 CFL Eastern All-Star Selections
Bryan chiu – Centre
Terry baker – Punter
Mike Pringle – Running Back

2001 Intergold CFLPA All-Star Selections

References

Montreal Alouettes
Montreal Alouettes seasons